Strathcona is a 19th-century variation of "Glen Coe", a river valley in Scotland.  The word was invented for use in the title Baron Strathcona and Mount Royal, first used for Donald Smith, a Canadian railway financier, in order to avoid association with the Massacre of Glencoe of 1692.

Strathcona may refer to:

People 
 Baron Strathcona and Mount Royal
 Donald Smith, 1st Baron Strathcona and Mount Royal
 Margaret Howard, 2nd Baroness Strathcona and Mount Royal
 Donald Howard, 3rd Baron Strathcona and Mount Royal
 Euan Howard, 4th Baron Strathcona and Mount Royal

Places

Canada

Alberta
 Old Strathcona, Edmonton, the former core of the City of Strathcona and now a Provincial Historic Area and arts and entertainment district
 Strathcona, Alberta, a former city, now a part of Edmonton
 Strathcona, Edmonton, a neighbourhood, part of the former city
 Strathcona County, a municipality outside Edmonton
 Strathcona Park, Calgary, a neighbourhood

Other places in Canada
 Strathcona (Hamilton, Ontario), a neighbourhood
 Strathcona, Vancouver, British Columbia, a neighbourhood
 Strathcona Islands, Nunavut
 Strathcona Park (Ottawa), a park in Ottawa, Ontario
 Strathcona Provincial Park, British Columbia
 Strathcona Regional District, Vancouver Island, British Columbia
 Strathcona Township, Ontario, a geographic township

Other places
 Mount Strathcona, Antarctica
 Strathcona, Minnesota, United States

Canadian electoral districts
 Edmonton—Strathcona, current federal electoral district
 Edmonton-Strathcona (provincial electoral district), current provincial electoral district
 Strathcona (electoral district), former federal electoral district
 Strathcona (N.W.T. electoral district), former Northwest Territories electoral district
 Strathcona (provincial electoral district), former provincial electoral district
 Strathcona-Sherwood Park, current provincial electoral district

Education
 Lord Strathcona Elementary School, Vancouver, British Columbia, Canada
 Strathcona Baptist Girls Grammar School, a private school for girls in Canterbury, Victoria, Australia
 Old Scona, a high school in Edmonton, Alberta, Canada
 Strathcona Composite High School, Edmonton, Alberta, Canada
 Strathcona Elementary School, part of Winnipeg School Division, Manitoba, Canada

Other 
 Lord Strathcona Medal, the highest civilian citation a Canadian cadet can receive
 Lord Strathcona's Horse (Royal Canadians), Canadian Forces regiment
 Strathcona (genus), a genus of rodent and sister genus to Masillamys
 , a sternwheel paddle steamer operated by the Hudson's Bay Company from 1898–1902 on the Pacific Northwest coast, see Hudson's Bay Company vessels

See also
 Strathcona Park (disambiguation)
 Transcona, Winnipeg